The 2014 FIBA Europe 3x3 Championships, hosted at the University Square in Bucharest, Romania, was the inaugural European 3x3 basketball event that featured separate competitions for men's and women's national teams. The tournament was held from 5 to 7 September 2014.

In the final of the men's tournament, host Romania beat Slovenia to win their first European championship title. In the final of the women's tournament, Russia also beat Slovenia to win their first European championship title. Slovenia finished in second place in both the men's and women's tournaments.

Qualification
The qualification events took place in the summer of 2014. A total of 15 teams of each gender (excluding the hosts Romania) qualified for the final tournament.

Men

Qualifier 1
Was held in Zánka, Hungary, 12–13 July 2014. Top five will qualify.
Pool A

|}
Pool B

|}
Knock-out stage

Switzerland qualified to the Final Tournament as fifth qualified.

Qualifier 2
Was held in Amsterdam, Netherlands, 19–20 July 2014. Top four, excluding hosts Romania, will qualify.

Pool A

|}

Pool B

|}

Knock-out stage

Andorra qualified to the Final Tournament as fifth qualified.

Qualifier 3
Was held in Riga, Latvia, 2–3 August 2014. Top six will qualify.

Pool A

|}

Pool B

|}

Knockout stage

Italy and Estonia also qualified to the Final Tournament as fifth and sixth qualified teams.

Women

Qualifier 1
Was held in Zánka, Hungary, 12–13 July 2014. Top five, excluding hosts Romania, will qualify.
Pool A

|}

Pool B

|}
Knock-out stage

Slovenia qualified to the Final Tournament as fifth qualified.

Qualifier 2
Was held in Amsterdam, Netherlands, 19–20 July 2014. Top four will qualify.
Pool A

|}

Pool B

|}

Knock-out stage

Qualifier 3
Was held in Riga, Latvia, 2–3 August 2014. Top six will qualify.

Pool A

|}

Pool B

|}

Knockout stage

Ireland and Slovakia also qualified to the Final Tournament as fifth and sixth qualified teams.

Final tournament
Groups were announced on 27 August 2014.

Men's tournament
Pool A

Pool B

Pool C

Pool D

Knockout stage

Final standings

Women's tournament
Pool A

Pool B

Pool C

Pool D

Knockout stage

Final standings

References

External links 

Results, rosters and information of the FIBA Europe Championships  
 

2014
2014 in 3x3 basketball
2014–15 in Romanian basketball
2014–15 in European basketball
International basketball competitions hosted by Romania
Sport in Bucharest